Lorraine Priest (June 5, 1966 in Leeds) is a British rhythmic gymnast.

Priest competed for Great Britain in the rhythmic gymnastics individual all-around competition at the 1984 Summer Olympics in Los Angeles. There she tied for 28th place in the preliminary (qualification) round and did not advance to the final.

References

External links 
 Lorraine Priest at Sports-Reference.com

1966 births
Living people
British rhythmic gymnasts
Gymnasts at the 1984 Summer Olympics
Olympic gymnasts of Great Britain
Sportspeople from Leeds
20th-century British women